Croton Gorge Park is a park in Cortlandt, New York owned and operated by Westchester County. The park is a popular venue for fishing, picnicking, sledding and cross country skiing. The Old Croton Trail begins in the park, which also includes a baseball field and an impressive fountain occasionally operated with high pressure water from the reservoir. The fountain was reopened in 2000 after having been out of service since the mid twentieth century.

The road over the top of the dam is one of four arteries for crossing the Croton River (only three of the bridges connect to public roads at both ends).  Following the September 11 attacks in 2001, this road has been closed to non-emergency vehicles as a security precaution, though it remains open to pedestrians and bicycles, and a popular local venue.  Previously, school buses had used the road as the best route available.

See also
 Croton-on-Hudson

References

External links
 Official site

Landmarks in New York (state)
Protected areas established in 1964
Parks in Westchester County, New York